

First half of the 20th century (World War I through World War II)

In 1915, during World War I, the concept of crimes against humanity was introduced into international relations for the first time when the Allied Powers sent a letter to the government of the Ottoman Empire, a member of the Central Powers, protesting massacres that were taking place within the Empire.

Ottoman Empire 

On 24 May 1915, the Allied Powers (Britain, France, and Russia) jointly issued a statement which for the first time ever explicitly charged a government, the Ottoman Empire, with committing a "crime against humanity" in reference to that regime's persecution of its Christian minorities, including Armenians, Assyrians and Greeks. Many researchers consider these events a single genocide rather than separate genocides, based on their belief that all of these genocides were part of the planned ethnoreligious purification of the Turkish state, a policy which was implemented and advanced by the Young Turks.

This joint statement stated, "[i]n view of these new crimes of Turkey against humanity and civilization, the Allied Governments announce publicly to the Sublime Porte that they will hold personally responsible for these crimes all members of the Ottoman Government, as well as those of their agents who are implicated in such massacres."

Armenians 
The Armenian genocide refers to the deliberate and systematic destruction of the Armenian population of the Ottoman Empire which occurred both during and just after World War I. It was implemented through extensive massacres and deportations, with the deportations consisting of forced marches under conditions which were designed to lead to the death of the deportees. The total number of resulting deaths is generally held to have been between one and one and a half million.

The genocide began on 24 April 1915, when Ottoman authorities arrested some 250 Armenian intellectuals and community leaders in Constantinople. Thereafter, the Ottoman military uprooted Armenians from their homes and forced them to march hundreds of miles, without food or water, to the desert of what is now Syria. The Armenians were massacred regardless of their age or gender, with rape and other acts of sexual abuse being commonplace. The majority of Armenian diaspora communities were founded as a result of these events. Mass killings continued to be committed by the Republic of Turkey during the Turkish–Armenian War phase of the Turkish War of Independence.

Modern Turkey succeeded the Ottoman Empire in 1923 and since then, it has denied the fact that a genocide occurred. In recent years, it has resisted calls to acknowledge the crime by scholars, countries and international organizations.

Assyrians 
The Assyrian genocide (also known as the Sayfo or the Seyfo; Aramaic: ܩܛܠܐ ܕܥܡܐ ܐܬܘܪܝܐ or ܣܝܦܐ) was committed against the Assyrian population of the Ottoman Empire during the First World War by the Young Turks. The Assyrian population of northern Mesopotamia (Tur Abdin, Hakkari, Van, Siirt region in modern-day southeastern Turkey and Urmia region in northwestern Iran) was forcibly relocated and massacred by Ottoman (Turkish and allied Kurdish) forces between 1914 and 1920. This genocide paralleled the Armenian genocide and Greek genocide. The Assyro-Chaldean National Council stated in a 4 December 1922, memorandum that the total death toll is unknown, but it estimated that about 750,000 Assyrians were murdered between 1914 and 1918.

Greeks 
The Greek genocide refers to the fate of the Greek population of the Ottoman Empire both during and after World War I (1914–18). Like the Armenians and the Assyrians, the Greeks were also subjected to massacres, expulsions, death marches and various other forms of persecution by the Young Turks. The mass killing of Greeks continued to occur under the rule of the Turkish National Movement during the Greco-Turkish War phase of the Turkish War of Independence. George W. Rendel of the British Foreign Office, among other diplomats, documented the massacres and deportations of Greeks during the post-Armistice period. Estimates of the number of Anatolian Greeks who were killed range from 348,000 to 900,000.

Mount Lebanon

Dersim Kurds 

The Dersim massacre refers to the depopulation of Dersim in Turkish Kurdistan, in 1937–38, in which approximately 13,000–40,000 Alevi Kurds were killed and thousands more of them were driven into exile. A key component of the Turkification process was a policy of massive population resettlement. The main document, the 1934 Law on Resettlement, was used to target the region of Dersim as one of its first test cases, with disastrous consequences for the local population.

Many Kurds and some ethnic Turks consider the events which took place in Dersim a genocide. A prominent proponent of this view is İsmail Beşikçi. Under international laws, the actions of the Turkish authorities were arguably not genocide, because they were not aimed at the extermination of a people, but at resettlement and suppression. A Turkish court ruled in 2011 that the events could not be considered genocide because they were not directed systematically against an ethnic group. Scholars such as Martin van Bruinessen, have instead talked of an ethnocide directed against the local language and identity.

Kingdom of Iraq 

The Simele massacre was a massacre committed by the armed forces of the Kingdom of Iraq during a campaign which systematically targeted the Assyrians of northern Iraq in August 1933. The term is not only used in reference to the massacre which occurred in Simele, it is also used in reference to the killing spree which occurred in 63 Assyrian villages in the Dohuk and Mosul districts and caused the death of between 5,000 and 6,000 Assyrians.

The Simele massacre inspired Raphael Lemkin to invent the concept of genocide. In 1933, Lemkin delivered a presentation to the Legal Council of the League of Nations conference on international criminal law in Madrid, for which he prepared an essay on the Crime of Barbarity as a crime against international law. The concept of the "crime of barbarity" evolved into the idea of genocide, and it was based on the Simele massacre, Armenian genocide, and later  the Holocaust.

Russia and the Soviet Union

Kyrgyz 

In 1916 in the territory which is currently named Urkun, Kyrgyzstan launched an uprising against Tsarist Russia. A public commission in Kyrgyzstan called the crackdown of 1916 in which 100,000 to 270,000 Kyrgyzstanis were killed in a genocide, though Russia rejected this characterization. Russian sources put the death toll at 3,000.

Pogroms against Jews

The Whitaker Report of the United Nations cited the massacre of 100,000 to 250,000 Jews in more than 2,000 pogroms which occurred during the White Terror in Russia as an act of genocide. During the Russian Civil War, between 1918 and 1921, a total of 1,236 pogroms were committed against Jews in 524 towns in Ukraine. Estimates of the number of Jews who were killed in these pogroms range from 30,000 to 60,000. Of the recorded 1,236 pogroms and excesses, 493 of them were carried out by Ukrainian People's Republic soldiers who were under the command of Symon Petliura, 307 of them were carried out by independent Ukrainian warlords, 213 of them were carried out by Denikin's army, 106 of them were carried out by the Red Army and 32 of them were carried out by the Polish Army.

Decossackization

During the Russian Civil War the Bolsheviks engaged in a genocidal campaign against the Don Cossacks. University of York Russian specialist Shane O'Rourke states that "ten thousand Cossacks were systematically slaughtered in a few weeks in January 1919" and he also states that this mass-slaughter "was one of the main factors which led to the disappearance of the Cossacks as a nation." The late Alexander Nikolaevich Yakovlev, head of the Presidential Committee for the Rehabilitation of Victims of Political Repression, notes that "hundreds of thousands of Cossacks were killed". Historian Robert Gellately claims that "the most reliable estimates indicate that between 300,000 and 500,000 were killed or deported in 1919–20" out of a population of around three million.

Peter Holquist states that the overall number of executions which were carried out is difficult to establish. In some regions hundreds were executed. In Khoper, the tribunal was very active, with a one-month total of 226 executions. The Tsymlianskaia tribunal oversaw the execution of over 700 people. The Kotel'nikovo tribunal executed 117 in early May and nearly 1,000 were executed overall. Others were not quite as active. The Berezovskaia tribunal made a total of twenty arrests in a community of 13,500 people. Holquist also notes that some of White reports of Red atrocities in the Don were consciously scripted for agitation purposes. In one example, an insurgent leader reported that 140 were executed in Bokovskaia, but later provided a different account, according to which only eight people in Bokovskaia were sentenced to death, and the authorities did not manage to carry these sentences out. This same historian emphasises he is "not seeking to downplay or dismiss very real executions by the Soviets".

Research by Pavel Polian from the Russian Academy of Sciences on the subject of forced migrations in Russia shows that more than 45,000 Cossacks were deported from the Terek province to Ukraine. Their land was distributed among pro-soviet Cossacks and Chechens.

Joseph Stalin

Multiple documented instances of unnatural mass death occurred in the Soviet Union when it was under the rule of Joseph Stalin. The causes of these unnatural mass deaths include Union-wide famines in the early 1920s and early 1930s and deportations of ethnic minorities. On 26 April 1991 the Supreme Soviet of the Russian Socialist Federal Soviet Republic, under its chairman Boris Yeltsin, passed the law On the Rehabilitation of Repressed Peoples with Article 2 denouncing all mass deportations as "Stalin's policy of defamation and genocide."

Holodomor

During the Soviet famine of 1930–1933, Ukraine, Kazakhstan and some densely populated regions of Russia were all affected, but the highest number of deaths occurred in Ukraine. The events which occurred there are referred to as the Holodomor and they are recognized as a genocide by the governments of Australia, Argentina, Georgia, Estonia, Italy, Canada, Lithuania, Poland, the US, Hungary and Portugal. The famine was caused by a variety of factors with different explanations depending on the scholar. According to Simon Payaslian, the scholarly consensus classifies the Soviet famine (at least the famine in Ukraine) as a genocide, but some scholars say that it remains a significant issue in modern politics and they do not believe that Soviet policies would fall under the legal definition of genocide.  Several scholars have disputed the belief that the famine was a genocidal act which was committed by the Soviet government, including J. Arch Getty, Stephen G. Wheatcroft, R. W. Davies, and Mark Tauger. Getty says that the "overwhelming weight of opinion among scholars working in the new archives ... is that the terrible famine of the 1930s was the result of Stalinist bungling and rigidity rather than some genocidal plan." Wheatcroft says that the Soviet government's policies during the famine were criminal acts of fraud and manslaughter, though not outright murder or genocide.  While Wheatcroft rejects the genocide characterization of the famine, he states that "the grain collection campaign was associated with the reversal of the previous policy of Ukrainisation."

A 2020 Journal of Genocide Research article by Oleh Wolowyna estimated 8.7 million deaths across the entire Soviet Union including 3.9 million in Ukraine, 3.3 million in Russia, and 1.3 million in Kazakhstan, plus a lower number of dead in other republics. According to the All-Union census of 1926–1937, the rural population in the North Caucasus decreased by 24%. In the Kuban alone, from November 1932 to the spring of 1933, the number of documented victims of famine was 62,000. According to other historians, the real death toll is many times higher. For example, one paper estimates over 14% of the Krasnodar Oblast which roughly includes the Kuban perished due to the famine. The self-identification of the Ukrainian population of Kuban decreased from 915,000 in 1926, to 150,000 in 1939.

According to some scholars, collectivization in the Soviet Union and the lack of favored industries were the primary contributors to famine mortality (52% of excess deaths), and some evidence shows that ethnic Ukrainians and Germans were discriminated against.  Lewis H. Siegelbaum, Professor of History at Michigan State University, states that Ukraine was hit particularly hard by grain quotas which were set at levels which  most farms could not produce. The 1933 harvest was poor, coupled with the extremely high quota level, which led to starvation conditions.  The shortages were blamed on kulak sabotage, and authorities distributed what supplies were available only in the urban areas. According to a Centre for Economic Policy Research paper published in 2021 by Andrei Markevich, Natalya Naumenko, and Nancy Qian, regions with higher Ukrainian population shares were struck harder with centrally planned policies corresponding to famine, and Ukrainian populated areas were given lower amounts of tractors which were correlated to a reduction in famine mortality, ultimately concluding that 92% of famine deaths in Ukraine along with 77% of famine deaths in parts of Russia and Belarus can be explained by the fact that there was systematic bias against Ukrainians. The collectivization and high procurement quota explanation for the famine is somewhat called into question by the fact that the oblasts of Ukraine with the highest losses being Kyiv and Kharkiv which produced far lower amounts of grain than other sections of the country. Oleh Wolowyna comments that peasant resistance and the ensuing repression of said resistance was a critical factor for the famine in Ukraine and parts of Russia populated by national minorities like Germans and Ukrainians allegedly tainted by "fascism and bourgeois nationalism" according to Soviet authorities.

Ukraine's Yuschenko administration recognized the Holodomor as an act of genocide and it pressured international governments to do the same. This move was opposed by the Russian government and some members of the Ukrainian parliament, especially the Communists. A Ukrainian court found Joseph Stalin, Vyacheslav Molotov, Lazar Kaganovich, Genrikh Yagoda, Yakov Yakovlev, Stanislav Kosior, Pavel Postyshev, Vlas Chubar and Mendel Khatayevich posthumously guilty of genocide on 13 January 2010. As of 2010, the Russian government's official position was that the famine took place, but it was not an ethnic genocide; former Ukrainian president Viktor Yanukovych supported this position. A ruling of 12 January 2010 by Kyiv's Court of Appeal declared the Soviet leaders guilty of "genocide against the Ukrainian national group in 1932–33 through the artificial creation of living conditions intended for its partial physical destruction."

Kazakhstan
Some historians and scholars consider the Kazakh famine of 1932–33 to have been a genocide of Kazakhs. The Soviet authorities undertook a campaign of persecution against the nomads in the Kazakhs, believing that the destruction of the class was a worthy sacrifice for the collectivization of Kazakhstan. Europeans in Kazakhstan had disproportionate power in the party which has been argued as a cause of why indigenous nomads suffered the worst part of the collectivization process rather than the European sections of the country. Regarding the Kazakh catastrophe, Michael Ellman states that it "seems to be an example of 'negligent genocide' which falls outside the scope of the UN Convention". However, historian Robert Kindler  refuses to call the famine a genocide, claiming that doing so masks the culpability of lower-level cadres who were locally rooted among the Kazakhs themselves. Historian Sarah Cameron argues that while Stalin did not intend to starve Kazakhs, he did see some deaths as a necessary sacrifice to achieve the political and economic goals of the regime. However, Sarah Cameron believes that while the famine combined with a campaign against nomads was not genocide in the sense of the UN definition, it does comply with Raphael Lemkin's original concept of genocide, which considered destruction of culture to be as genocidal as physical annihilation. Historian Stephen Wheatcroft criticizes this view because he believed that the high expectations of central planners were sufficient to demonstrate their ignorance of the ultimate consequences of their actions. Wheatcroft views the state's policies during the famine as criminal acts, though not as intentional murder or genocide. Niccolò Pianciola argues that from Raphael Lemkin's point of view on genocide, all nomads of the Soviet Union were victims of the crime, not just the Kazakhs. A monument for the famine's victims was constructed in 2017. The Turkic Council has described the famine as a "criminal Stalinist ethnic policy". A genocide remembrance day is commenced on 31 May for the victims of the famine.

Poles in the Soviet Union

Several scholars write that the killing, on the basis of nationality and politics, of more than 120,000 ethnic Poles in the Soviet Union from 1937 to 1938 was genocide. An NKVD official remarked that Poles living in the Soviet Union were to be "completely destroyed". Under Stalin the NKVD's Polish operation soon arrested some 144,000, of whom 111,000 were shot and surviving family members deported to Kazakhstan.

According to historian Michael Ellman, "The 'national operations' of 1937–38, notably the 'Polish operation', may qualify as genocide as defined by the UN Convention, although there is as yet no legal ruling on the matter". 
Karol Karski argues that the Soviet actions against Poles are genocide according to international law. He says that while the extermination was targeting other nationalities as well and according to the criteria other than ethnicity, but as long as Poles were singled out basing on their ethnicity, that makes the actions to be genocide. The historian Terry Martin, refers to the "national operations", including the "Polish Operation", as ethnic cleansing and "ethnic terror". According to Martin, the singling out of diaspora nationalities for arrest and mass execution "verged on the genocidal". Historian Timothy Snyder called the Polish Operation genocidal: "It is hard not to see the Soviet "Polish Operation" of 1937-38 as genocidal: Polish fathers were shot, Polish mothers sent to Kazakhstan, and Polish children left in orphanages where they would lose their Polish identity. As more than 100,000 innocent people were killed on the spurious grounds that theirs was a disloyal ethnicity, Stalin spoke of "Polish filth"." Norman Naimark called Stalin's policy towards Poles in the 1930s "genocidal" but did not consider the entire Great Purge genocidal since it targeted political opponents as well. Simon Sebag Montefiore presents a similar opinion.

In practice abandoning its 'official socialist' ideology of the "fraternity of peoples", the Soviets in the Great Terror of 1937–1938 targeted "a national group as an enemy of the state." During their Polish operation against party enemies the NKVD hit "Soviet Poles and other Soviet citizens associated with Poland, Polish culture, or Roman Catholicism. The Polish ethnic character of the operation quickly prevailed in practice... ." Stalin was pleased at "cleaning out this Polish filth." Among the several different nationalities targeted in the Great Terror (e.g., Latvians, Estonians, Finns, Belarusians), "ethnic Poles suffered more than any other group." In 1940 the Soviets also killed thousands of Polish POWs, among about 22,000 Polish citizens shot in the Katyn forest and other places.

Chechens, Ingush, Balkars, Karachay, Kalmyks, Meskhetian Turks, and Volga Germans

The decree on the deportation of Volga Germans was published on 28 August 1941. Men aged 15–55 and later women between the ages of 16 and 45 were forced to work in the forests and mines of Siberia and Central Asia under conditions similar to those prevailing in the slave labor camps of the Gulag. The expulsion of the Germans from the Volga ended in September 1941. The number sent to Siberia and Kazakhstan totaled approximately 438,000. Together with 27,000 evicted in the same ethnic cleansing of the Stalingrad Oblast and 47,000 of the Saratov Oblast, the total number sent to forced internal exile was about 950,000, of which 30% died during deportation (285,000), and most never returned to the Volga Region.

On 26 February 2004 the plenary assembly of the European Parliament recognized the deportation of Chechen people during Operation Lentil (23 February 1944), as an act of genocide, on the basis of the 1907 IV Hague Convention: The Laws and Customs of War on Land and the CPPCG.

The event began on 23 February 1944, when the entire population of Checheno-Ingushetia was summoned to local party buildings where they were told they were to be deported as punishment for their alleged collaboration with the Germans. The inhabitants were rounded up and imprisoned in Studebaker trucks and sent to Siberia.
Many times, resistance was met with slaughter, and in one such instance, in the aul of Khaibakh, about 700 people were locked in a barn and burned to death. By the next summer, Checheno-Ingushetia was dissolved; a number of Chechen and Ingush placenames were replaced with Russian ones; mosques and graveyards were destroyed, and a massive campaign to burn numerous historical Chechen texts was nearly complete. Many people from remote villages were executed per Lavrentiy Beria's verbal order that any Chechen or Ingush deemed 'untransportable should be liquidated' on the spot.
Throughout the North Caucasus, about 700,000 (according to Dalkhat Ediev, 724297, of which the majority, 412,548, were Chechens, along with 96,327 Ingush, 104,146 Kalmyks, 39,407 Balkars and 71,869 Karachais). Many died on the trip, of exposure in Siberia's extremely harsh environment. The NKVD, supplying the Russian perspective, gives the statistic of 144,704 killed in 1944–1948 alone (with a death rate of 23.5% for all groups). Estimates for Chechen deaths alone (excluding the NKVD statistic), range from about 170,000 to 200,000 thus ranging from over a third of the total Chechen population to nearly half being killed (of those that were deported, not counting those killed on the spot) in those 4 years alone.

Deportations of Estonians, Latvians, and Lithuanians

The mass deportations of up to 17,500 Lithuanians, 17,000 Latvians and 6,000 Estonians carried out by Stalin's government marked the start of another genocide. Added to the killing of the Forest Brethren and the renewed Dekulakization which followed the Soviet reconquest of the Baltic states at the end of World War II, the total number of people who were deported to Siberia consisted of 118,559 Lithuanians, 52,541 Latvians, and 32,540 Estonians. The high death rate of the deportees during their first few years in exile, caused by the failure of the Soviet authorities to provide them with suitable clothing and housing after they reached their destination, led some sources to label the affair an act of genocide. Based on the Martens Clause and the principles of the Nuremberg Charter, the European Court of Human Rights held that the March deportation constituted a crime against humanity. According to Erwin Oberlander, these deportations are a crime against humanity, rather than genocide.

Lithuania began holding trials for genocide in 1997. Latvia and Estonia followed in 1998. Latvia has since convicted four security officers and in 2003 it sentenced a former KGB agent to five years in prison. Estonia tried and convicted ten men and is investigating others. In Lithuania by 2004 23 cases were before the courts, but as of the end of the year none had been convicted.

In 2007 Estonia charged Arnold Meri (then 88 years old), a former Soviet Communist Party official and highly decorated former Red Army soldier, with genocide. Shortly after the trial opened, it was suspended because of Meri's frail health and then abandoned when he died. A memorial in Vilnius, Lithuania, is dedicated to genocidal victims of Stalin and Hitler, and the Museum of Genocide Victims in Lithuania, which opened on 14 October 1992 in the former KGB headquarters, chronicles the imprisonment and deportation of Lithuanians.

Crimean Tatars

The ethnic cleansing and deportation of the Crimean Tatars from Crimea was ordered by Joseph Stalin as a form of collective punishment for alleged collaboration with the Nazi occupation regime in Taurida Subdistrict during 1942–1943. The state-organized removal is known as the Sürgünlik in Crimean Tatar. A total of more than 230,000 people were deported (the entire ethnic Crimean Tatar population), of which more than 100,000 were killed via starvation or disease.

Many activists, politicians, scholars and historians go even further and consider this deportation a crime of genocide. Professor Lyman H. Legters argued that the Soviet penal system, combined with its resettlement policies, should count as genocidal since the sentences were borne most heavily specifically on certain ethnic groups, and that a relocation of these ethnic groups, whose survival depends on ties to its particular homeland, "had a genocidal effect remediable only by restoration of the group to its homeland". Soviet dissidents Ilya Gabay and Pyotr Grigorenko both classified the event as a genocide. Historian Timothy Snyder included it in a list of Soviet policies that "meet the standard of genocide."

On 12 December 2015, the Ukrainian Parliament issued a resolution recognizing this event as genocide and established 18 May as the "Day of Remembrance for the victims of the Crimean Tatar genocide." The parliament of Latvia recognized the event as an act of genocide on 9 May 2019. The Parliament of Lithuania did the same on 6 June 2019. Canadian Parliament passed a motion on 10 June 2019, recognizing the Crimean Tatar deportation of 1944 (Sürgünlik) as a genocide perpetrated by Soviet dictator Stalin, designating 18 May to be a day of remembrance.

Japan

Korea and Taiwan (Japanese era)

Nanjing Massacre

During the Nanjing Massacre which was committed during the early months of the Second Sino-Japanese War, the Japanese committed mass killings against the Chinese population of the city, during which up to 300,000 people were killed. Bradley Campbell described the Nanjing Massacre as a genocide, because the Chinese were unilaterally killed en masse by the Japanese during the aftermath of the battle for the city, despite its successful and certain outcome. However, Jean-Louis Margolin does not believe that the Nanjing atrocities should be considered a genocide because only prisoners of war were executed in a systematic manner and the targeting of civilians was sporadic and done without orders by individual actors.

Southeast Asia

Various atrocities  were also committed during the Japanese colonial era, one of them was the Manila massacre.

Dominican Republic
In 1937, Dominican dictator Rafael Trujillo ordered the execution of Haitians who were living in the Dominican Republic. The Parsley massacre, known in the Dominican Republic as "El Corte" (the Cutting), lasted approximately five days. The name comes from claims that soldiers used a Shibboleth to identify suspected Haitians, showing them parsley leaves and asking them to pronounce the name of the plant. Spanish-speaking Dominicans would be able to pronounce the Spanish word for parsley ("perejil") correctly, whereas native Haitian Creole speakers would struggle to pronounce the 'r' adequately. Those who mispronounced "perejil" were assumed to be Haitian and slaughtered. The massacre resulted in the deaths of 20,000 to 30,000 people.

Republic of China and Tibet
In the 1930s, the Kuomintang's Republic of China government supported Muslim warlord Ma Bufang when he launched seven expeditions into Golog, causing the deaths of thousands of Tibetans. Uradyn Erden Bulag called the events that followed genocidal, while David Goodman called them ethnic cleansing. One Tibetan counted the number of times Ma attacked him, remembering the seventh attack that made life impossible. Ma was anti-communist and he and his army wiped out many Tibetans in northeast and eastern Qinghai and destroyed Tibetan Buddhist Temples. Ma also patronized the Panchen Lama, who was exiled from Tibet by the Dalai Lama's government.

Nazi Germany and Nazi-occupied Europe

The Holocaust 

The Holocaust is widely recognized as a genocide. The term "genocide" appeared in the indictment of 24 German leaders. Count three of the indictment stated that all of the defendants had "conducted deliberate and systematic genocide – namely, the extermination of racial and national groups...."

The term "Holocaust" (derived from the Greek words hólos, "whole" and kaustós, "burnt") is often used to describe the killing of approximately six million European Jews, as part of a program of deliberate extermination which was planned and executed by the National Socialist German Workers Party in Germany, which was led by Adolf Hitler. Many scholars do not include other groups in the definition of the Holocaust, because they choose to limit it to the genocide of the Jews.

The Holocaust was accomplished in stages. Legislation to remove the Jews from civil society was enacted years before the outbreak of World War II. Concentration camps were established in which inmates were used as slave laborers and murdered through over-work. When Nazi Germany conquered new territories in Eastern Europe, specialized units which were called Einsatzgruppen murdered Jews and political opponents in mass shootings. Jews and Romani people were crammed into ghettos before they were crammed into box cars and transported to extermination camps by freight train where, if they survived the journey, the majority of them were murdered in gas chambers. Every arm of Germany's bureaucracy was involved in the logistics of the mass murder, turning the country into what one Holocaust scholar has called "a genocidal nation."

This list gives a total of over 3.8 million; of these, 80–90% were estimated to have been Jews. These seven camps thus accounted for half of the total number of Jews who were murdered in the entire Nazi Holocaust. Virtually the entire Jewish population of Poland was murdered in these camps.

Since 1945, the most commonly cited figure for the total number of Jews who were murdered has been six million. The Yad Vashem Holocaust Martyrs' and Heroes' Remembrance Authority in Jerusalem, writes that there is no precise figure for the number of murdered Jews, but it has been able to find documentation of more than three million names of Jewish victims, which it displays at its visitors center. The figure most commonly used is the six million attributed to Adolf Eichmann, a senior SS official.

There were about eight to ten million Jews in the territories controlled directly or indirectly by Germany (the uncertainty arises from the lack of knowledge about how many Jews there were in the Soviet Union). The six million murdered in the Holocaust thus represent 60 to 75 percent of these Jews. Of Poland's 3.3 million Jews, about 90 percent were murdered. The same proportion were murdered in Latvia and Lithuania, but most of Estonia's Jews were evacuated in time. Of the 750,000 Jews in Germany and Austria in 1933, only about a quarter survived. Although many German Jews emigrated before 1939, the majority of these fled to Czechoslovakia, France or the Netherlands, from where they were later deported and murdered.

In Czechoslovakia, Greece, the Netherlands, and Yugoslavia (whose territories were divided into the German-Italian Puppet state Independent State of Croatia run by the Ustaše and the German Occupied Territory of the Military Commander in Serbia governed by Milan Nedić’s Government of National Salvation), over 70 percent were murdered. In The Independent State of Croatia, Ustaše and the German Army carried out extermination of Jews as well as Roma in Ustaše-run concentration camps like Jasenovac, while a considerable number of Jews were rounded up by the Ustaše and turned over to the Germans for extermination in Nazi Germany. In the Territory of the Military Commander in Serbia, the German Army carried out the extermination of Jews as well as Roma with support and assistance from Milan Nedić's regime and Dimitrije Ljotić's fascist organization Yugoslav National Movement (Zbor), who had joint control over the Banjica concentration camp with the German Army in Belgrade. 50 to 70 percent were murdered in Romania, Belgium and Hungary. It is likely that a similar proportion were killed in Belarus and Ukraine, but these figures are less certain. Countries with notably lower proportions of deaths include Bulgaria, Denmark, France, Italy, and Norway. Albania was the only country occupied by Germany that had a significantly larger Jewish population in 1945 than in 1939. About two hundred native Jews and over a thousand refugees were provided with false documents, hidden when necessary, and generally treated as honored guests in a country whose population was roughly 60% Muslim. Additionally, Japan, as an Axis member, had its own unique response to German policies regarding Jews; see Shanghai Ghetto.

In addition to those who died in extermination camps, another 800,000 to one million Jews were murdered by the Einsatzgruppen in the occupied Soviet territories (an approximate figure, since the Einsatzgruppen murders were frequently undocumented). Many more died through execution or of disease and malnutrition in the ghettos of Poland before they could be deported.

In the 1990s, the opening of government archives in Eastern Europe resulted in the adjustment of the death tolls which were published in the pioneering works by Hilberg, Dawidowicz and Gilbert (e.g. compare Gilbert's estimation of two million deaths in Auschwitz-Birkenau with the updated figure of one million in the Extermination Camp data box). As pointed out above, Wolfgang Benz has been carrying out work on the more recent data. He concluded in 1999:

Non-Jewish victims

Some scholars broaden the definition of the Holocaust by including other German killing policies which were carried out during the war, including the mistreatment of Soviet POWs, crimes against ethnic Poles, the mass murder of mentally and physically disabled Germans (which the Nazi authorities framed as "euthanasia"), persecution of Jehovah's Witnesses, the genocide of Romani, and other crimes which the Nazis committed against ethnic, sexual, and political minorities. Using this definition, the total number of Holocaust victims is 11 million people. Donald Niewyk suggests that the broadest definition, including Soviet deaths due to war-related famine and disease, would produce a death toll of 17 million. Overall, about 5.7 million (78 percent) of the 7.3 million Jews in occupied Europe perished. This was in contrast to the five to 11 million (1.4 percent to 3.0 percent) of the 360 million non-Jews in German-dominated Europe. The United States Holocaust Memorial Museum has the number of people murdered during the Holocaust era at 17 million.

Romani people

The treatment of the Romani people was not consistent in the different areas that Nazi Germany conquered. In some areas (e.g. Luxembourg and the Baltic countries), the Nazis murdered virtually the entire Romani population. In other areas (e.g. Denmark and Greece), there is no record of Romanis being subjected to mass murder.

Donald Niewyk and Frances Nicosia write that the death toll was at least 130,000 out of the nearly one million Romani who resided in Nazi-controlled Europe. Michael Berenbaum writes that serious scholarly estimates lie between 90,000 and 220,000. A study by Sybil Milton, senior historian at the U.S. Holocaust Memorial Museum, calculated at least 220,000 and possibly closer to 500,000 victims, but this study explicitly excluded the Roma who were murdered in Romania and Yugoslavia (Serbia, Croatia, Bosnia) where the genocide of Romanies was intense. Martin Gilbert estimates a total of more than 220,000 deaths out of the 700,000 Romani who lived in Europe. Ian Hancock, Director of the Program of Romani Studies and the Romani Archives and Documentation Center at the University of Texas at Austin, has argued in favor of a much higher figure of between 500,000 and 1,500,000 deaths, claiming that the Romani death toll proportionally equaled or exceeded that of Jewish victims.

Slavic population of the Soviet Union

The Nazi German government implemented Generalplan Ost which was part of its plan for the colonization of Central and Eastern Europe. Implementation of the plan necessitated genocide and ethnic cleansing which was to be undertaken on a vast scale in the territories which were occupied by Germany during World War II. The plan entailed the enslavement, expulsion, and the partial extermination of most Slavic peoples in Europe, peoples whom the Nazis considered racially inferior and non-Aryan. The programme operational guidelines, which were prepared in the years 1939–1942, were based on the policy of Lebensraum which was designed by Adolf Hitler and the Nazi movement, as well as being a fulfillment of the Drang nach Osten ideology of German expansion to the east. As such, it was intended to be a part of the New Order in Europe.

The civilian death toll in the regions which were occupied by Germany was estimated to be 13.7 million. Philimoshin cited sources from the Soviet era to support his figures, he used the terms "genocide" and "premeditated extermination" when he referred to the deaths of 7.4 million civilians in the occupied USSR which were caused by the direct, intentional actions of violence. Civilians killed in reprisals during the Soviet partisan war account for a major part of the huge toll. The report of Philimoshin lists the deaths of civilian forced laborers in Germany as totaling 2,164,313. G. I. Krivosheev in the report on military casualties gives a total of 1,103,300 dead POWs. The total of these two figures is 3,267,613, which is in close proximity to estimates by western historians of about 3 million deaths of prisoners in German captivity. In the occupied regions Nazi Germany implemented a policy of forced confiscation of food which resulted in the famine deaths of an estimated 6% of the population, 4.1 million persons.

Poland

The Intelligenzaktion ("anti-intelligentsia action") was a highly secretive genocidal action of Nazi Germany against Polish elites (primarily intelligentsia; teachers, doctors, priests, community leaders etc.) in the early stages of World War II. It was conducted as part of an attempt to complete the Germanization of the western regions of occupied Poland before their planned annexation. The operation cost the lives of 100,000 Poles according to the Institute of National Remembrance.

Adolf Hitler believed that the Polish elites might inspire the Poles to disobey their new German masters so he decreed that they had to be eliminated beforehand. The aim was the elimination of Polish society's elite, which was very broadly defined as: Polish nobles, intelligentsia, teachers, entrepreneurs, social workers, military veterans, members of national organizations, priests, judges, political activists, and anyone who had attended secondary school. It was continued by the German AB-Aktion operation in Poland in the spring and summer of 1940, which saw the massacre of Lwów professors and the execution of about 1,700 Poles in the Palmiry forest. Several thousand civilians were executed or imprisoned. The Einsatzgruppen were also responsible for the indiscriminate murder of Poles during the 1941 German invasion of the Soviet Union (which itself had invaded a sizeable portion of pre-WWII Polish territory, murdering dozens of thousands of imprisoned Poles in turn).Our strength is our quickness and our brutality.... I have given the order—and will have everyone shot who utters but one word of criticism—that the aim of this war does not consist in reaching certain geographical lines, but in the enemies' physical elimination. Thus, for the time being only in the east, I put ready my Death's Head units, with the order to kill without pity or mercy all men, women, and children of the Polish race or language... Adolf Hitler, Obersalzberg Speech, given on 22 August 1939, a week before the invasion

Volhynia and Eastern Galicia

The massacres of Poles in Volhynia and Eastern Galicia were part of an ethnic cleansing operation carried out by the Ukrainian Insurgent Army (UPA) West in the Nazi-occupied regions of Eastern Galicia (Nazi created Distrikt Galizien in General Government), and UPA North in Volhynia (in Nazi created Reichskommissariat Ukraine), from March 1943 until the end of 1944. The peak took place in July/August 1943 when a senior UPA commander, Dmytro Klyachkivsky, ordered the liquidation of the entire male Polish population between 16 and 60 years of age. Despite this, most were women and children. The UPA murdered 40,000–60,000 Polish civilians in Volhynia, from 25,000 to 30,000–40,000 in Eastern Galicia. The murders were directly linked with the policies of the Bandera fraction of the Organization of Ukrainian Nationalists, whose goal, specified at the Second Conference of the OUN-B, was to remove non-Ukrainians from a future Ukrainian state.

The massacres are recognized in Poland as ethnic cleansing with "marks of genocide". According to IPN prosecutor Piotr Zając, the crimes have a "character of genocide".

On 22 July 2016, the Parliament of Poland passed a resolution declaring 11 July a National Day of Remembrance to honor the Polish victims murdered by Ukrainian nationalists, and formally calling the massacres a Genocide.

Serbs in the Independent State of Croatia

After the Nazi invasion of Yugoslavia on 6 April 1941, Croatian Nazis and fascists who were known as the Ustašhe established a clerical fascist regime which was known as the Nezavisna Država Hrvatska (Independent State of Croatia) or the NDH. Immediately afterwards, the Ustashe launched a genocidal campaign against Serbs, Jews and Romani people who lived inside the borders of the NDH. The Ustaše's view of national and racial identity, as well as the theory that the Serbs constituted an inferior race, was influenced by anti-Eastern Orthodox sentiment, anti-Serb sentiment and the works of Croatian nationalists and intellectuals which were written from the end of the 19th century to the beginning of the 20th century. The Ustaše enacted a policy which called for a solution to the "Serbian problem" in Croatia. The solution, as it was promulgated by Mile Budak, was to "kill one-third of the Serbs, expel one-third, and convert one-third (to Roman Catholicism)." Historian Michael Phayer explained that the Nazis' decision to murder all of Europe's Jews is estimated by some to have begun in the latter half of 1941, specifically in late June, which, if correct, would mean that the genocide in Croatia began before the Final Solution.

From 1941 to 1945, the Ustaše regime killed at least 200,000 to 500,000 Serbs, It is estimated that in the infamous Jasenovac concentration camp alone, which was notorious for its high mortality rate (higher than the mortality rate at Auschwitz) and the barbaric practices which occurred in it, approximately 100,000 people were murdered. The Independent State of Croatia was the only Axis installed puppet state which erected children's concentration camps. Serbs who lived in the NDH suffered one of the highest casualty rates in Europe during World War II, while the NDH was one of the most lethal regimes which existed during the 20th century. Historian Stanley G. Payne claimed that the direct and indirect executions which were carried out by the NDH regime were an "extraordinary mass crime", which in proportionate terms exceeded the crimes which were committed by any other European regime besides Hitler's Third Reich, while Jonathan Steinberg stated that the crimes which were committed against Serbs who lived in the NDH were the "earliest total genocide to be attempted during World War II." Payne added that the crimes which were committed in the NDH were only proportionately surpassed by the crimes which were committed by the Khmer Rouge in Cambodia and the crimes which were committed by several of the extremely genocidal African regimes.

Bosnian Muslims and Croats

The mass-killings which were committed against non-Serbs by the Chetniks, a Yugoslav Royalist and Serbian nationalist movement and guerrilla force, in Bosnia and Herzegovina, Croatia and Sandžak constituted a genocide, according to some historians. This can be seen through the mass-killings of ethnic Croats and Muslims that conformed to the Moljević plan ("On Our State and Its Borders") and the 1941 'Instructions' which were issued by the Chetnik leader, Draža Mihailović, concerning the cleansing of non-Serbs on the basis of creating a post-war Greater Serbia. The number of victims by ethnicity includes between 18,000 and 32,000 Croats and 29,000 to 33,000 Bosnian Muslims.

Disabled and mentally ill

Between 1939 and 1941, 80,000 to 100,000 mentally ill adults in institutions were murdered; 5,000 children in institutions; and 1,000 Jews in institutions. Outside the mental health institutions, the figures are estimated to number 20,000 (according to Dr. Georg Renno, the deputy director of Schloss Hartheim, one of the killing faciiities known as "euthanasia" centers) or 400,000 (according to Franz Ziereis, the commandant of Mauthausen-Gusen concentration camp). Another 300,000 were forcibly sterilized. Overall it has been estimated that over 270,000 individuals with mental disorders of all kinds were murdered, although their mass murder has received relatively little historical attention. Along with the physically disabled, people suffering from dwarfism were persecuted as well. Many were put on display in cages and experimented on by the Nazis. Despite not being formally ordered to take part, psychiatrists and psychiatric institutions were at the center of justifying, planning and carrying out the atrocities at every stage, and "constituted the connection" to the later annihilation of Jews and other "undesirables" in the Holocaust. After strong protests by the German Catholic and Protestant churches on 24 August 1941 Hitler ordered the cancellation of the T4 program.

The program was named after Tiergartenstraße 4, the address of a villa in the Berlin borough of Tiergarten, the headquarters of the General Foundation for Welfare and Institutional Care, led by Philipp Bouhler, head of Hitler's private chancellery (Kanzlei des Führer der NSDAP) and Karl Brandt, Hitler's personal physician.

Brandt was tried in December 1946 at Nuremberg, along with 22 others, in a case known as United States of America vs. Karl Brandt et al., also known as the Doctors' Trial. He was hanged at Landsberg Prison on 2 June 1948.

See also

Notes

References

Bibliography

 
 
 Braudel, Fernand, The Perspective of the World, vol. III of Civilization and Capitalism 1984 (in French 1979).
 
 
 
 
 
 
 
 Cronon, William, Changes in the Land: Indians, Colonists, and the Ecology of New England 1983 
 
 Crosby, Alfred W., Ecological Imperialism: The Biological Expansion of Europe, 900–1900, Cambridge University Press, 1986 
 
 
 
 
 
 
 
 
 
 
  Excerpts Chapter 1: Genocide in prehistory, antiquity, and early modernity

Further reading 

Genocides